Mauro Di Lello (born 12 March 1978) is a former footballer who played as a defender. Currently he holds a consultant role within the Malta Football Association, following his stint playing for Sliema Wanderers and Birkirkara.

References

Living people
1978 births
Italian footballers
S.S. Lazio players
A.S.G. Nocerina players
Pietà Hotspurs F.C. players
Sliema Wanderers F.C. players
Birkirkara F.C. players
Maltese Premier League players
Italian expatriate footballers
Expatriate footballers in Malta
Italian expatriates in Malta
Association football defenders